Teemu Jäntti (born 2 March 2000) is a Finnish professional footballer who plays as a midfielder for Ilves in the Veikkausliiga.

References

2000 births
Living people
Finnish footballers
Finland youth international footballers
Pallokerho Keski-Uusimaa players
FC Lahti players
Reipas Lahti players
FC Ilves players
Kakkonen players
Veikkausliiga players
Association football midfielders